Major Dad is an American sitcom television series created by Richard C. Okie and John G. Stephens, developed by Earl Pomerantz, that originally ran from September 17, 1989, to May 17, 1993 on CBS, starring Gerald McRaney as Major John D. MacGillis and Shanna Reed as his wife Polly. The cast also includes Beverly Archer, Matt Mulhern, Jon Cypher, Marisa Ryan, Nicole Dubuc, and Chelsea Hertford.

Synopsis
The first season is set at the fictional Camp Singleton (meant to represent Camp Pendleton), where hard-charging United States Marine Corps Major John D. "Mac" MacGillis is commander of the infantry training school's acquisition division. MacGillis's life is changed when he falls in love with a liberal journalist, Polly Cooper. The show follows Mac in his work life, where he deals with Lt. Eugene Holowachuk (Matt Mulhern), Sgt. Byron James (Marlon Archey), and Merilee Gunderson (Whitney Kershaw), as well as his home life, as he learns to live with Polly's three daughters, Elizabeth, Robin, and Casey.

At the beginning of the second season, the MacGillis family moves to Camp Hollister (based on Marine Corps Base Quantico), where Mac must adapt to the role of staff secretary (or "staff weenie") and the crazy antics of Commanding (Brigadier) General Marcus C. Craig, Aide-de-Camp 1st Lt. Eugene Holowachuk (who transferred with Major MacGillis from Camp Singleton), and Gunnery Sgt. Alva "Gunny" Bricker, the General's secretary, a no-nonsense Marine, who despite her brusque nature and unprepossessing physical appearance, is the target of many enthusiastic (and unseen) suitors.

Character development increased during the second season, such as the revelation that MacGillis is a former member of the United States Marine Corps Silent Drill Platoon.

Cast

Episode guide

Awards and nominations

References

External links

Major Dad introduction (video clip)

1989 American television series debuts
1993 American television series endings
1980s American sitcoms
1990s American sitcoms
CBS original programming
English-language television shows
Military comedy television series
Television series by Universal Television
Television shows set in California
Television shows set in Virginia
Television shows about the United States Marine Corps
Television series about families
1980s American workplace comedy television series
1990s American workplace comedy television series